Social security contribution may refer to:

Social security in Australia
Social security in India
The Social Security Contributions and Benefits Act 1992 in the United Kingdom
Social Security in the United States